Idle railway station was a railway station in Idle, West Yorkshire, England.

History
During the 1860s, two small railway companies were formed to promote suburban railways in Bradford, the Bradford, Eccleshill and Idle Railway and the Idle and Shipley Railway.

The line was open to goods traffic on 4 May 1874, and to passengers on 18 January 1875. Idle railway station opened on 15 April 1875 and was situated south of the High Street next to the Oddfellows Hall, built in 1840.

Passenger service on the line ceased on 2 February 1931 and the passenger station closed, though goods traffic continued on the whole line until October 1964 and between Shipley and Idle until 1968.

Little now remains to show that there was ever a railway station in Idle. The station was just south of the bridge where the railway crossed High Street at the junction with New Street. It then followed the route of what is now Idlecroft Road south towards .

Route

References

Railway stations in Great Britain opened in 1875
Railway stations in Great Britain closed in 1931
Disused railway stations in Bradford
Former Great Northern Railway stations
1875 establishments in England
1931 disestablishments in England